Nikolai Petrovich Kasterin (1869–1947) was a Russian physicist, student of Aleksandr Stoletov. His 1903 doctoral dissertation, portions of which were published in German in the Proceedings of the Royal Academy of Sciences in Amsterdam under the sponsorship of Heike Kamerlingh Onnes, is considered to be a pivotal contribution to multiple scattering theory (MST) by such experts as Paul Peter Ewald and Jan Korringa. The MST formalism is widely used for electronic structure calculations as well as diffraction theory, and is the subject of many books.

Biography
Kasterin studied at the Physical-Mathematical Faculty of Moscow University under the supervision of Aleksandr Stoletov. He graduated in 1892 and continued to work for Stoletov as a laboratory assistant. In 1896-1899 he trained abroad. In 1899 Kasterin returned to Moscow University where he became an assistant professor and taught theoretical physics. In 1905 Kasterin defended his doctoral dissertation "On the propagation of waves in non-uniform medium".

In 1906 Kasterin became a professor at the Department of Physics of Novorossiyskii University in Odessa. He also headed the Institute of Physics. In 1906-1922 he was the Chairman of the Department of Physics at Novorossiyskii University.

In 1922 Kasterin moved to the Biophysics Institute in Moscow.

Since 1930 he was a consultant for various scientific institutions including CAGI, Angarsrtoy and the National Institute of Building Materials.

Kasterin authored more than forty scientific publications in theoretical physics. He was also known for his works opposing special relativity.

References

1869 births
1947 deaths
Moscow State University alumni
Relativity critics
Russian physicists